The Rise World Tour is the first world tour by South Korean singer Taeyang, in support of his second studio album RISE. The tour started on August 12, 2014 in Osaka, Japan and ended on March 1, 2015 in Taiwan.

Background
On May 30, 2014, YG Entertainment announced that Taeyang will kick off his first tour in Japan with four shows in two cities set to commence in mid-August. As soon as the concerts was announced, ticket-reservations for the tour by local fans poured in, resulting in an additional four concerts in three cities. On September 5, 2014, two shows were announced in Seoul, making it Taeyang's first solo concert in his country in four years since 2010. The two concerts in Seoul were sold out in less than ten minutes, and a third show was later added due high demand. In November 2014, nine cities across seven Asian countries were announced as a part of the world tour, including Hong Kong, China, Malaysia, Indonesia, Taiwan, Thailand and Singapore.

Special guests
G-Dragon (South Korea, Seoul)
Seungri (Taiwan, Taipei)

Set list

Tour dates

DVD and blu-ray

SOL Japan Tour "Rise" 2014'

SOL Japan Tour "Rise" 2014' is a live DVD & Blu-ray by Taeyang, released on January 25, 2015 in Japan. The DVD/Blu-ray was filmed during the artist's live performance at Tokyo International Forum, as a part of his first Japan tour which attracted 70,000 fans. The DVD includes a total of the 21 songs that were sung live in the concert, including a photobook, a DVD of Making of SOL JAPAN TOUR "RISE" 2014, Q&A Section, Dance Selection.

Track listing

Charts

References

External links
Official Site
YG Entertainment
Big Bang Japan Official Site

2014 concert tours
2015 concert tours
BigBang (South Korean band) concert tours
Taeyang